The 2023 Norwegian Second Division (referred to as PostNord-ligaen for sponsorship reasons) will be a Norwegian football third-tier league season. The league will consist of 28 teams divided into two groups of 14 teams.

The league will be played as a double round-robin tournament, where all teams play 26 matches. The season is set to start on 10 April 2023 and end on 11 November 2023, not including play-off matches.

Team changes
Last season, Moss and Hødd were promoted to the 2023 Norwegian First Division, while Odd 2, Staal Jørpeland, Eidsvold Turn, Asker and Frigg were relegated to the 2023 Norwegian Third Division.

Grorud and Stjørdals-Blink were relegated from the 2022 Norwegian First Division, while Lyn, Aalesund 2, Brann 2, Fram Larvik, Junkeren and Strømsgodset 2 were promoted from the 2022 Norwegian Third Division.

Group 1

Teams

The following 14 clubs compete in group 1:

League table

Results

Group 2

Teams

The following 14 clubs compete in group 2:

League table

Results

Promotion play-offs

The teams who finish in second place in their respective group qualify for the promotion play-offs, where they face each other over two legs. The winner goes on to play against the 14th-placed team in the First Division for a place in the First Division next season.

References

Norwegian Second Division seasons
3
Norway